Dalby-cum-Skewsby is a civil parish in the Hambleton district of North Yorkshire, England. The population of the civil parish taken at the 2011 Census was less than 100. Details are included in the civil parish of Brandsby-cum-Stearsby. It is part of the group of spring line villages to the south of the Howardian Hills.

The church, dedicated to St Peter, is a small stone building in the Norman style.

At  in Bonnygate Lane / High Lane is a turf maze called The City of Troy. It is described as the smallest turf maze in Europe.

References

External links

 Page for Dalby in Kelly's Directory of North and East Ridings of Yorkshire, 1893.

Villages in North Yorkshire
Civil parishes in North Yorkshire